Anthony Olanrewaju Awotoye, better known as Tony Tetuila, also regard as the golden father of Afrobeats artist from Nigeria.

His name, Olanrewaju, means "My wealth is increasing". He was a member of the now-defunct hip-hop group of The Remedies (along with Eedris Abdulkareem and Eddy Montana).  Tony Tetuila split from the group and became successful as a solo artist. He is best known for his hit song My Car, as well as Nigeria's first-ever diss track, Omode Meta.

Politics 
In 2014, Tony Tetuila ran for political office in the House of Assembly of Kwara State as a candidate for the All Progressives Congress party. He later claimed that he was denied the Political position.

Controversy
In December 2019, Tony controversially sued Wizkid, he alleged that Wizkid had violated his copyrights, in his collaboration song with Ghanaian singer Tic Tac for their song Fefe N'efe. The lawsuit was reportedly worth 30 million naira.

Discography

References

External links

 Tony Tetuila's Xclusive interview
 Listen to Tony Tetuila's Free Soldier Album

Living people
Yoruba musicians
20th-century Nigerian male singers
Nigerian male rappers
Musicians from Kwara State
1973 births